The Religion Act 1580 (23 Eliz.1 c. 1) was an Act of the Parliament of England during the English Reformation.

The Act made it high treason to persuade English subjects to withdraw their allegiance to the Queen, or from the Church of England to Rome, or to promise obedience to a foreign authority.

The Act also increased the fine for absenteeism from Church to £20 a month or imprisonment until they conformed. Finally, the Act fined and imprisoned those who celebrated the mass and attended a mass.

See also
Praemunire
High treason in the United Kingdom

Notes

External links
 
 
 

Acts of the Parliament of England concerning religion
1580 in law
1580 in England
Treason in England
1580 in politics
1580 in religion
1580 in Christianity